is a Japanese word meaning "swallowtail butterfly". It is Taira clan's Mon.

Ageha may also refer to:

People
Ageha Ohkawa (born 1967), Japanese manga artist
Ageha Tanigawa (born 2003), Japanese swimmer

Fiction
Ageha, the central character in the 1996 Japanese film Swallowtail Butterfly (film)
Ageha, a character in the 2002 video game Shinobi (2002 video game)
Ageha, a character in the video game Shinobido: Way of the Ninja
Ageha, a character in the manga series Basara (manga)
Ageha, the main character of the manga series Papillon (manga)
Ageha, a character in the manga and anime series GetBackers
Ageha Squad, a fictitious unit in the anime series Eureka Seven; see List of Eureka Seven characters
Ageha Yoshina, the main protagonist in the manga series Psyren
Ageha Kurono, a character in the anime and manga series Rosario + Vampire; see List of Rosario + Vampire characters
Ageha Himegi, a character in the visual novel, If My Heart Had Wings; see If My Heart Had Wings (visual novel)
Ageha, a character in the anime and manga series Omamori Himari; see List of Omamori Himari characters
Ageha Kuki, a character in the visual novel and anime Maji de Watashi ni Koi Shinasai!
Ageha, a character in the video game series Pop'n Music

Music
"Ageha", a song by a Japanese rock group Tourbillon (band)
"Ageha", a song by a Japanese singer Harumi Tsuyuzaki (also known as Lyrico)
"Ageha", a song by a Japanese rock group Going Under Ground
"Ageha", a song by a Japanese pop band Core of Soul
Ageha (album), an album by a Japanese group w-inds
Ageha, an album by a Japanese singer Yozuca
"Ageha", a song by a Japanese rock group Mucc
"AGEHA", a song by Ryutaro Nakahara in the game Beatmania IIDX 11 IIDXRED
"AGEHA", a song by the Generations from Exile Tribe

Other uses
ageHa, a weekend club event at the Usen Studio Coast event space in Tokyo, Japan
Koakuma Ageha, a fashion magazine dedicated to "gyaru" and hostess styles

Japanese feminine given names